"Kaleidoscope Skies" is a song by German electronic music duo Jam & Spoon featuring American singer Plavka, released as the first single from their second album, Kaleidoscope (1997). It charted in several European territories, reaching number two in Hungary and number seven in Poland. Additionally, it was a top 20 hit in Austria, Denmark, Germany and Italy. In the UK, it peaked at number 48, while it reached number 33 in Scotland. The picture on the cover of the single is a reproduction of a painting by Abdul Mati and was used in 1970 for the album Hooteroll?, performed by Howard Wales and Jerry Garcia. A music video was also produced to promote the single.

Critical reception
British magazine Music Week rated the song three out of five, adding, "Less frenetic than their usual style, this sweet, laid-back number fuses Spanish guitar with eastern influences."

Track listing
 12" single, UK (1997)
"Kaleidoscope Skies" (Club Mix) – 6:09
"Kaleidoscope Skies" (Open the Door/The Course Remix) – 4:40
"I Pull My Gun" (DJ Quicksilver Remix) – 7:22

 CD single, Europe (1997)
"Kaleidoscope Skies" (Radio Edit) – 3:29
"Kaleidoscope Skies" (Club Mix) – 6:10

 CD maxi, Germany (1997)
"Kaleidoscope Skies" (Radio Edit) – 3:29
"Kaleidoscope Skies" (Club Mix) – 6:09
"I Pull My Gun Once" – 5:04
"Pull My Gun Twice" – 5:20

 CD maxi (Remixes), Germany (1997)
"Kaleidoscope Skies" (Jam & Spoon Remix) – 4:37
"Kaleidoscope Skies" (Open the Door/The Course Remix) – 4:40
"I Pull My Gun..." (DJ Quicksilver Remix) – 7:21

Charts

References

 

1997 songs
1997 singles
Jam & Spoon songs
Dance Pool singles